Richard Dawson Kiel (September 13, 1939 – September 10, 2014) was an American actor. Kiel's next-most-recognized role is the tough but eloquent Mr. Larson in Happy Gilmore (1996). Other notable films include The Longest Yard (1974), Silver Streak (1976), Force 10 from Navarone (1978), Cannonball Run II (1984), Pale Rider (1985), and Tangled (2010).

Early life
Kiel was born in Detroit. His extraordinary height was a result of gigantism, a condition caused by an excess of human growth hormone. When he was nine years old, his family moved to Los Angeles County, where Kiel graduated from Baldwin Park High School.

Before becoming an actor, Kiel worked in several jobs, including as a door-to-door vacuum cleaner salesman, a nightclub bouncer, and as a cemetery plot salesman. From 1963 to 1965, Kiel worked as a night-school mathematics instructor at the William B. Ogden Radio Operational School in Burbank, California.

Career
His career included movies, TV guest starring, and co-authoring.

Television
Kiel appeared in many television shows throughout the 1960s to the 1980s, including The Twilight Zone ("To Serve Man", 1962), Laramie ("Street of Hate", 1961), I Dream of Jeannie, The Rifleman ("The Decision", 1961), Honey West, Gilligan's Island, The Monkees, Daniel Boone, Emergency!, Starsky & Hutch, Land of the Lost, Simon & Simon, Kolchak: The Night Stalker, and The Fall Guy.

Due to his size, Kiel was often cast in villainous roles. He appeared as Voltaire, the towering mute-but-lethal assistant to Dr. Miguelito Loveless in three first-season episodes of The Wild Wild West. In the Man from U.N.C.L.E. episode "The Vulcan Affair" (1964), Kiel appeared as a guard in Vulcan's plant and portrayed Merry in "The Hong Kong Shilling Affair". In 1967, he played a monster in The Monkees episode "I Was a Teenage Monster".

He later appeared in an episode of The Wild Wild West, titled "The Night of the Simian Terror", as Dimas, the outcast son of a wealthy family, banished because of birth defects that distorted his body and apparently affected his mind. The episode first aired February 16, 1968. This episode is significant, because it allowed Kiel the opportunity to really act rather than just look intimidating.

In 1977, Kiel and Arnold Schwarzenegger were both considered for playing the Hulk in the American television series The Incredible Hulk. After Schwarzenegger was turned down due to his height, Kiel started filming the pilot. However, the producers quickly decided they wanted a more muscular Hulk rather than the towering Kiel, so he was dismissed. Kiel later said he did not mind losing the part, because as he could only see out of one eye, he reacted badly to the contact lenses he had to wear for the role. He also found the green makeup unpleasant and difficult to remove. His scenes were then reshot with Lou Ferrigno.

Film
Kiel broke into films in the early 1960s with Eegah (1962), which was later featured on Elvira's Movie Macabre and Mystery Science Theater 3000, as were The Phantom Planet (1961) and The Human Duplicators (1965). He also produced, co-wrote, and starred in The Giant of Thunder Mountain (1991). He also had a brief non-speaking appearance leaving a gym in the Jerry Lewis movie The Nutty Professor (1963).

The James Bond film producers spotted Kiel in Barbary Coast, and thought he was ideal for the role of Jaws in The Spy Who Loved Me (1977). He was one of the few Bond villains to appear in two Bond films, later appearing in Moonraker (1979). He was often shot with his mouth closed or briefly showing his dangerous smile as he admitted the mouthpiece to simulate the metal teeth was extremely painful to wear and could only be used for a few minutes on every take. He reprised his role of Jaws in the video game called James Bond 007: Everything or Nothing, supplying his voice and likeness. This was his second outing as a metal-toothed villain; a year before being cast in The Spy Who Loved Me, he had played Reace in the comedy-thriller film Silver Streak (1976). He used his size for comedic effect, as the "best-dressed giant" Mr. Eddie, in So Fine with Ryan O'Neal. Kiel also starred in the film Pale Rider (1985). Acting as the main antagonist's henchman, he redeems his character's status by saving the hero from a gunshot to the back.

Although earlier roles had offered him little dialogue, his role in Happy Gilmore (1996) was quite the opposite. As Mr. Larson, Happy Gilmore's former employer, Kiel exchanges several one-liners with both Adam Sandler's Happy and Christopher McDonald's Shooter McGavin. Kiel took a quieter profile after Happy Gilmores release, but left semi-retirement to record a role for Tangled (2010). In the acclaimed animated Disney film, he portrayed Vlad, a surprisingly softhearted thug who collects ceramic unicorns.

Filmography

Features

Television

{| class="wikitable"
|-  style="background:LightSteelBlue; text-align:center;"
! Year !! Title !! Role !! Notes
|-
| 1960 || Klondike || Duff Brannigan || Episode: "Bare Knuckles"
|-
| 1961 || Laramie || Rake, Tolan's Helper || Episode: "Run of the Hunted", Uncredited
|-
| 1961 || The Phantom || Mike "Big Mike" ||
|-
| 1961 || Thriller || Master Styx || Episode: "Well of Doom"
|-
| 1961 || The Rifleman || Carl Hazlitt || Episode: "The Decision"
|-
| 1962 || The Twilight Zone || Kanamit || Episode: "To Serve Man"
|-
| 1963 ||The Paul Bunyan Show || Paul Bunyan ||
|-
| 1964 || The Man from U.N.C.L.E. || Henchman for Mr. Vulcan  || Episode: "The Vulcan Affair"Uncredited
|-
| 1965 || The Man from U.N.C.L.E. || Merry || Episode: "The Hong Kong Shilling Affair"
|-
| 1965 || I Dream of Jeannie || Ali || Episode: "My Hero"
|-
| 1966 || Honey West || Groalgo || Episode: "King of the Mountain"
|-
| 1966 || My Mother the Car || "Cracks" || Episode: "A Riddler on the Roof"
|-
| 1966 || The Wild Wild West || Voltaire || Episodes: "The Night the Wizard Shook the Earth"1965: "The Night That Terror Stalked the Town"1965: "The Night of the Whirring Death"
|-
| 1966 || Gilligan's Island || Ghost || Episode: Ghost-a-Go-Go"
|-
| 1967 || The Monkees || Monster || Episode: "I Was a Teenage Monster" 
|-
| 1967 || The Monroes || Casmir || Episode: "Ghosts of Paradox"
|-
| 1968 || I Spy || "Tiny" || Episode: "A Few Miles West of Nowhere"
|-
| 1968 || The Wild Wild West || Dimas || Episode: "The Night of the Simian Terror"
|-
| 1968 || It Takes a Thief || Willie Trion || Episode: "The Galloping Skin Game"
|-
| 1969 || Daniel Boone || Le Mouche || Episode: "Benvenuto...Who?"
|-
| 1970 || Disneyland || Luke Brown || Episode: "The Boy Who Stole the Elephant: Part 1 & 2"
|-
| 1974 || Kolchak: The Night Stalker || The Diablero || Episode: "Bad Medicine"
|-
| 1974 || Emergency! || Carlo || Episode: "I'll Fix It"
|-
| 1974 || Kolchak: The Night Stalker || The "Père Malfait" || Episode: "The Spanish Moss Murders"
|-
| 1975 || Switch || Loach || Episode: "Death Heist"
|-
| 1976 || Starsky & Hutch || Iggy || Episode: "Omaha Tiger"
|-
| 1975–1976 || Barbary Coast || "Moose" Moran || 14 episodes, 1975–1976
|-
| 1977 || Land of the Lost || Malak || Episodes: "Survival Kit""Flying Dutchman"
|-
| 1977 || The Hardy Boys/Nancy Drew Mysteries || The Manager || Episode: "The Mystery of the Haunted House"
|-
| 1977 || Young Dan'l Boone || Unknown || Episode: "The Game"
|-
| 1980 || Match Game PM || Himself, Panelist || One episode
|-
| 1981 || The Fall Guy || Animal || Episode: "That's Right, We're Bad"
|-
| 1983 || Simon & Simon || Mark Horton || Episode: "The Skeleton Who Came Out of the Closet"
|-
| 1988 || Out of This World || Norman || Episode: "Go West, Young Mayor"
|-
| 1989 || Superboy || Vlkabok || Episode: "Mr. and Mrs. Superboy"
|-
| 2000 || Bloodhounds Inc. || Mortimer || Episode: "Fangs for the Memories"
|}

Video games

Personal life and death
Kiel's first marriage was to Faye Daniels in 1960. They divorced in the early 1970s. He later married Diane Rogers, who was 5 ft 1 in (154 cm) tall. Their marriage lasted for 40 years, until his death. They had four children and nine grandchildren. Despite being over two feet taller than his second wife, she described their mutual attraction as "We see eye to eye on so many things."

Kiel co-authored a biography of the abolitionist Cassius Marcellus Clay titled Kentucky Lion. In 2002, Kiel published his autobiography, Making It Big in the Movies''. Kiel was also a born-again Christian. His website states his religious conversion helped him to overcome alcoholism.

On September 10, 2014, three days short of his 75th birthday, Kiel died at St. Agnes Medical Center in Fresno, California, of a heart attack. The week before, he had been admitted to the hospital for a broken leg.

See also

References

External links

 
 

1939 births
2014 deaths
20th-century American male actors
20th-century Christians
21st-century American male actors
21st-century Christians
American Christians
American male film actors
American male television actors
American male video game actors
American male voice actors
American male writers
American people of German descent
Male actors from Detroit
People with acromegaly
Writers from Detroit